"Happy Ending" is a song by American rapper Hopsin. It was released on October 13, 2017 along with an accompanying music video as the second single from his fifth studio album No Shame. The video was originally taken down from YouTube due to nudity. The song and video, which chronicle Hopsin's experience paying for sexual services at an Asian massage parlor, received nearly universally negative reviews from music critics and drew backlash for its racist and sexist depiction of Asian women.

Background 
"Happy Ending" is a hip hop song which tells the story of Hopsin visiting an Asian massage parlor. The song features the stereotypical Oriental riff in the instrumentation. In the chorus, Hopsin sings in a mock Asian accent with broken english as he portrays an Asian woman working in a massage parlor, offering "sucky-sucky", a reference to the Da Nang prostitute in the 1987 Stanley Kubrick film Full Metal Jacket. Hopsin raps about his original intentions of finding a prostitute on Backpage, only to change his mind after seeing an advertisement for an Asian massage parlor. In graphic detail, Hopsin describes how the masseuse massages his "buttcrack" and "nutsack" before she offers him a combination of a handjob, oral sex and penetrative sex for $125. After an hour, he ejaculates on her breasts. In the outro, Hopsin confirms his return to the massage parlor, "because when the times get rough, a happy ending is necessary."

In an interview with XXL, Hopsin explained that the song was inspired by his real-life experiences paying for 'happy endings' at massage parlors, a habit which started at age 19.

Music video 
A music video for "Happy Ending" was released on October 13, 2017. In the video, Hopsin is having a discussion in a restaurant about a "happy ending" as he explains to his friends what the colloquial usage of the term means, telling them his story about the Asian massage parlor. The scene then shifts to an Asian massage parlor, where Hopsin waits in the lobby before being taken into the back room for a massage. Midway through, the masseuse offers sex, holding two jars with money labeled "Suckee" and "Fuckee" that cover her breasts. The video portrays a simulated handjob, fellatio and penetrative sex while Hopsin ejaculates confetti.

The video was removed from YouTube after less than a day as it violated the website's nudity guidelines. Hopsin angrily responded on Twitter claiming that there was no nudity in the video, tweeting "I busted my ass on that happy ending video! I can't believe they removed my shit! Fucked up my whole marketing campaign" and "I ain't see no nipples in that shit. I wore a dick sock." However, Hopsin halted his attempts to put the video back on YouTube, saying "I would never want to piss off a whole race of people and the Asian community isn't really happy about it and that's not the type of attention I want on myself."

Reception and controversy 
"Happy Ending" received negative reception from music critics. In a review of No Shame, Pitchfork stated that Hopsin "raps about getting off at a massage parlor in a terrible mock accent, mimicking the masseuse for the hook: 'If you no say nothing, I can give you sucky-sucky.' It would be one thing if the song was just crude or offensive or unlistenable, but it’s a trifecta." Anthony Fantano named "Happy Ending" as the worst single of 2017, and three years later also called it the worst single of the entire 2010s decade. The song and video have been described as portraying "Asian women perpetuating the racist stereotype of being mere trophies of Asian fetishists", oblivious to the fact that "most women who are forced to work as prostitutes in such parlors are actually victims of human trafficking."

Congresswoman Nydia Velázquez condemned the song and video, releasing a statement saying, "This video blatantly plays on racist and sexist stereotypes about Asian women and their sexuality. Not only does this offensive song and video demean Asian people, but it ignores the fact that many women in massage parlors like those depicted in the piece are human trafficking victims. Hopsin is essentially celebrating human trafficking and lampooning those who have been forced into prostitution. I encourage all online music platforms to stop carrying this offensive song and video."

References

External links 
 Unofficial music video reupload

2017 singles
2017 songs
African-American–Asian-American relations
Erotic massage
Hopsin songs
Music video controversies
Obscenity controversies in music
Race-related controversies in music
Songs written by Hopsin
YouTube controversies